Andras Guttormsson, (c. 1490 to 1544), was, from 1531 to 1544, lawman (prime minister) of the Faroe Islands.

Andras Guttormsson lived in Kálgarður, Sumba, Faroe Islands, but came from Norway. Andras Guttormsson was the father of Guttormur Andrasson, who followed him in the post.

References

G.V.C. Young's textbook Færøerne – fra vikingetiden til reformationen, 1982
Løgtingið 150 – Hátíðarrit. Tórshavn 2002, Bind 2, S. 366. (Avsnitt Føroya løgmenn fram til 1816) (PDF-Download)

Lawmen of the Faroe Islands
16th-century heads of government
Year of birth unknown
Year of death unknown
1490 births
16th-century Norwegian people